The 2021 Central American Women's Handball Championship took place in San Salvador, El Salvador from 5 to 7 August 2021. It acted as a qualifying tournament for the 2021 South and Central American Women's Handball Championship.

Results

Round robin
All times are local (UTC−06:00).

References

External links
COSCABAL Official Website

Central American Handball Championship
Central American Women's Handball Championship
International sports competitions hosted by El Salvador